Software Technology Park is a light rail station of the Circular Line of the Kaohsiung rapid transit system. It is located in Cianjhen District, Kaohsiung, Taiwan.

Station overview
The station is a street-level station with two side platforms. It is located at the junction of Fusing 3rd Road and Chenggong 2nd Road.

Station layout

Around the station
 Kaohsiung Software Technology Park
 American Institute in Taiwan Kaohsiung Branch Office
 Chenggong School of Special Education
 IKEA Kaohsiung
 Carrefour Chenggong Store

References

2015 establishments in Taiwan
Railway stations opened in 2015
Circular light rail stations